The Mercury Montego is a nameplate that was applied to three separate generations of vehicles marketed by the Mercury division of Ford Motor Company.  Taking its name from Montego Bay, Jamaica, the nameplate made its first appearance for 1967 in the Canadian market as part of the Mercury-derived Meteor model line.  For 1968, the Mercury Montego made its debut across North America, becoming the Mercury counterpart of the Ford Torino intermediate-size model line for two generations.

For the 1977 model year, Ford revised the intermediate-size product ranges of both its Ford and Mercury divisions; as part of a mid-cycle update, Mercury discontinued the Montego nameplate and expanded the Mercury Cougar line to include a full range of sedans and wagons (with the Ford Gran Torino becoming the Ford LTD II).

After a 28-year absence, the Montego nameplate was revived for the 2005 model year, this time applied to a full-size sedan.  Slotted in size between the Mercury Milan and Grand Marquis, the 2005 Montego was the Mercury counterpart of the Ford Five Hundred. For the 2008 model year, the Montego adopted the nameplate of the car it had replaced, becoming the final generation of the Mercury Sable.

First generation (1968–1971)

For 1968, Mercury introduced the Montego as part of its intermediate Mercury Comet product line, consolidating the Comet Capri and Comet Caliente into a single nameplate; the high-performance Mercury Cyclone became a distinct model line.  As the Comet was the Mercury counterpart of the Ford Fairlane, the Montego was introduced alongside the Ford Torino.  For 1970, Mercury intermediates adopted the Montego name entirely (as the Comet became the Mercury counterpart of the Ford Maverick).        

The first-generation Montego was offered as a four-door sedan, two-door hardtop, four-door station wagon, and two-door convertible.  The model line was offered in base and MX trims (replacing the Comet Capri and Comet Caliente, respectively).  

For 1970, the Montego underwent a mid-cycle exterior redesign to add a forward-thrusting hood and grille design.  The convertible was withdrawn, replaced by a four-door hardtop.  For all sedans, a MX Brougham trim was added (with a woodgrained MX Villager station wagon), distinguished by concealed headlamps.

Second generation (1972–1976)

For 1972, the second-generation Montego was introduced alongside the redesigned Ford Torino. In a major design shift, the intermediate Ford/Mercury model lines shifted from unibody to body-on-frame construction; similarly to the General Motors A-platform, the Montego adopted a split-wheelbase chassis (114-inch for two-doors, 118-inch for four-doors and station wagons). True four-door hardtops were replaced by "pillared hardtops" (frameless door glass remained, supported by a thin B-pillar), while two-door Montegos retained hardtop roofs, though with much wider C-pillars.

The Cyclone had reverted from a stand-alone model line to an option package for 1972 for the Montego; only 30 1972 Cyclones would be produced, making it among the rarest Mercury vehicles.  As a replacement for the Cyclone, Mercury introduced the Montego GT, a counterpart of the Ford Gran Torino SportsRoof for the first time; the Montego GT was offered from 1972 to 1973.      

As a standard engine, the Montego was equipped with a 250 cubic-inch inline-six, with five different V8 engines available as options.  Starting in 1974, the Mercury Montego was available with a 460 V8, shared with the Mercury Marquis/Colony Park.

The redesign was initially met with success, as 1972 Montego sales increased 136% over 1971; the MX Brougham saw the largest increases in sales, as the two-door increased its sales by 897% while the four-door increased by 1,021%.  

Following the 1973 gas crisis, sales were depressed by industry-wide fuel economy concerns.  The redesigned 1974 Mercury Cougar shifted from the Ford Mustang chassis and upsized to Montego two door bodies which were also shared with the mid-year addition of the Ford Elite.  The new Cougar which was more competitive in the growing intermediate personal luxury car segment produced model overlap causing slower sales of the Montego along with the success of the Mercury Monarch, as buyers shifted from intermediates and full-size cars towards fuel-efficient compact sedans.

For 1975, the six-cylinder and 302 V8 engines were dropped from the lineup, leaving the 351 V8 as the standard engine.

For 1977, in a mid-cycle redesign of the Ford intermediate lines, several nameplates were shifted.  Mercury rebranded the Montego as the Cougar, in favor of offering a full range of body styles for the Cougar line alongside the flagship XR7 personal luxury coupe; Ford rebranded the Torino/Gran Torino as a facelifted LTD II, with the Elite rebranded as a downsized 1977 Thunderbird.

Third generation (2005–2007)

For the 2005 model year, Mercury revived the Montego nameplate after a 28-year hiatus.  The Mercury counterpart of the Ford Five Hundred, the third-generation Montego entered production on July 12, 2004.  Slotted below the Grand Marquis, the third-generation Montego was introduced as a replacement for the Sable alongside the 2006 Milan. 

In place of the three trims of the Five Hundred, the Montego was offered in two: Luxury and Premier. 

The third-generation Montego was manufactured at the Chicago Assembly facility in Chicago, Illinois alongside the Ford Five Hundred and the Ford Freestyle; the latter was a CUV wagon serving as a replacement for the Taurus/Sable station wagon.

Chassis 

The third-generation Montego was built on the Ford D3 platform.  Developed in collaboration with Volvo, the D3 chassis is the first full-size Ford platform to utilize front-wheel drive (or its optional all-wheel drive).  Shifting away from the body-on-frame Panther platform, the D3 chassis utilizes unibody construction.  Only two inches shorter than the Grand Marquis in wheelbase, the Montego was nearly 500 pounds lighter in curb weight.    

The Montego was equipped with a single engine, shared with the previous Taurus/Sable, a 203 hp version of the 3.0L DOHC Duratec V6.  Front-wheel drive versions were equipped with a 6-speed Aisin AW F21++ automatic while AWD versions were equipped with a ZF CVT.

Total Vehicle Geometry (TVG) 
The Montego, Five Hundred and Ford Freestyle were manufactured using a Volvo-derived system called Total Vehicle Geometry (TVG) to ensure fit, finish and craftsmanship — by requiring comprehensive participation by all engineers as well as suppliers and vendors.  Heavily using computer-aided design, TVG tracks all design modifications, translating them into the central CAD database which in turn allows each engineer access to current project data.  The system improves part tolerance at the body-in-white stage as well as early cabin integrity testing, via air leakage testing.  TVG improved fit and finish at the first prototype stage and decreases pilot manufacturing times.  

For side impact protection the bodywork is braced at the B-pillar via an energy-channeling structural cross-car roof tube and a corresponding undercar energy channelling cross-tube — with the front seats mounted above the lower tube, locating them above a side impact energy path.  The system derives from a side-impact safety design marketed by Volvo as its Side Impact Protection System (SIPS).

Exterior 
The first completely new full-size Mercury since the 1992 model year, the third-generation Montego was offered solely as a four-door sedan.  With a height over five feet tall (matching the far-longer Maybach 57), the Montego was the tallest Mercury sedan in over 50 years.  

While visibly sharing much of its exterior with its Ford Five Hundred counterpart, the third-generation Montego was distinguished by exterior several design features.  In line with other Mercury vehicles, the Montego was styled with a vertical waterfall-style grille with satin aluminum exterior trim (limiting chrome to the roofline).  Exclusive to the Montego, HID headlamps and LED taillamps were standard equipment (the latter, the largest array of LED lights on any Ford vehicle worldwide).   

Ford chief designer, George Bucher, said "it was a challenge to sculpt a Ford-styled body around a Volvo chassis, and added that designers used what he calls plainer surfaces with taut lines to give the car a modern look without losing its passenger-car proportions."

Interior 

In contrast to both the Grand Marquis and the Sable, the third-generation Montego was available solely in a five-passenger configuration.  In line with the 2001-2003/2005 Grand Marquis LSE and 2003-2004 Marauder, the Montego was configured with bucket seats and a console-mounted shifter.    

Slotted in between the Five Hundred SE and SEL, the Montego Luxury featured cloth seats as standard, with leather seats as optional.  The Mercury equivalent of a Five Hundred Limited, the Montego Premier featured leather seats as standard; all-wheel drive and a sunroof were among the few available options.  

In contrast to the Grand Marquis, the Montego offered a 60/40 fold-down rear seat, expanding the 21 cubic-foot trunk space.  With the decklid closed, objects up to 10 feet in length could be transported within the car (when using the optional fold-down front passenger seat).

At its launch, two airbags were standard, with four more available as an option (front-seat airbags and side-curtain)   

A design feature of the Montego includes its overall height to add interior space to the vehicle.  To appeal to buyers of both sedans and sport-utility vehicles, Ford raised the viewpoint of the driver.  Marketed as Command Seating, the Montego features high H-point seating (the location of the occupants hip-point relative to the road or the vehicle floor); its H-point is closer to the ground than that of a sport utility vehicle, but higher than a typical sedan, easing entry and exit. Also, the distance from the H-point to the floor of the vehicle is reflective of more upright seating. At its press launch, Ford said the Five Hundred's H-point is up to four and a half inches higher than its competitors.  The Montego also features theater seating, where second row seats are higher: in the front row, the distance between the H-point and the heel point, where the occupant's foot touches the floor, is 12.7 inches — in the second row the distance between the H-point and the heel point is 15.7 inches.

Sales

Discontinuation

Following a poor critical reception, the Mercury Montego and Ford Five Hundred fell under sales projections from the 2005 to 2007 model years.  For the 2008 model year, the Montego and Five Hundred underwent a mid-cycle update, with pre-production prototypes unveiled at 2007 auto shows.  After his installation as Ford CEO, Alan Mulally ordered the model lines renamed before entering production, claiming higher brand value and recognition; the 2008 Mercury Montego adopted the Mercury Sable nameplate.    

For 2008, Mercury received an exterior styling update that better differentiated the two model lines; a powertrain upgrade replaced the 3.0L engine with a 3.5L engine (increasing output to 263 hp).

Use in competition

In the 1968 NASCAR Grand National stock car season, the fastback Fairlane body style proved much slicker than other makes, but the nose of the Mercury Cyclone Fastback was the main reason pointed to it being even slightly faster than its Ford counterpart. Cale Yarborough drove a Wood Brothers Cyclone to victory in the Daytona 500, and the Mercury bodies would remain a major force in NASCAR through 2 generations of bodies. 

The battle over aerodynamics would prompt Chrysler to respond with specialized "winged wonder" Daytona and Superbird bodies after its own fastback bodies proved disappointing.

References

Encyclopedia of American Cars by Publications International, 
Standard Catalog of Ford 1903-1998 by Krause Publications,

External links

 MyFord500/Taurus - The first Mercury Montego & Ford Five Hundred enthusiast web site
 Mercury Montego Project Car and Technical Articles

Montego
Cars introduced in 1968
Vehicles with CVT transmission
All-wheel-drive vehicles
Front-wheel-drive vehicles
Rear-wheel-drive vehicles
Mid-size cars
Full-size vehicles
Coupés
Sedans
Muscle cars
1960s cars
1970s cars
2000s cars
Ford D3 platform